Moitessieria rolandiana is a species of minute freshwater snail with an operculum, an aquatic gastropod molluscs or micromolluscs in the family Moitessieriidae. This species is endemic to France.

References

Moitessieriidae
Endemic molluscs of Metropolitan France
Gastropods described in 1863
Taxonomy articles created by Polbot